Rodolfo Tito de Moraes (born 5 March 1997), commonly known as Rodolfo or Tito, is a Brazilian footballer who currently plays as a defender for Zweigen Kanazawa, on loan from Metropolitano.

Career statistics

Club

Notes

References

External links

1997 births
Living people
Brazilian footballers
Brazilian expatriate footballers
Association football defenders
Clube Atlético Metropolitano players
Clube Atlético Itapemirim players
Boa Esporte Clube players
Montedio Yamagata players
Zweigen Kanazawa players
J2 League players
Brazilian expatriate sportspeople in Japan
Expatriate footballers in Japan